Test Valley Borough Council is elected every four years.

Political control

Leadership
The leaders of the council since 1980 have been:

Council elections
1973 Test Valley District Council election
1976 Test Valley District Council election (New ward boundaries)
1979 Test Valley Borough Council election
1983 Test Valley Borough Council election
1987 Test Valley Borough Council election (Borough boundary changes took place but the number of seats remained the same)
1991 Test Valley Borough Council election
1995 Test Valley Borough Council election (Borough boundary changes took place but the number of seats remained the same)
1999 Test Valley Borough Council election
2003 Test Valley Borough Council election (New ward boundaries)
2007 Test Valley Borough Council election
2011 Test Valley Borough Council election
2015 Test Valley Borough Council election
2019 Test Valley Borough Council election

Result maps

By-election results

References

External links
Test Valley Borough Council

 
Council elections in Hampshire
District council elections in England